Ogden House or Ogden Mansion may refer to:

in the United States (by state then city)
David Ogden House, Fairfield, Connecticut, listed on the NRHP in Fairfield County, West Virginia
Ogden House (Portland, Oregon), listed on the National Register of Historic Places in Multnomah County, Oregon
Belcher-Ogden House, Elizabeth, New Jersey, listed on the National Register of Historic Places listings in Union County, New Jersey
Belcher-Ogden Mansion-Benjamin Price-Price-Brittan Houses District, Elizabeth, New Jersey, listed on the NRHP in Union County, New Jersey
Ogden House (Swarthmore, Pennsylvania), listed on the National Register of Historic Places in Delaware County, Pennsylvania
Dennis J. Murphy House at Ogden Farm, Middletown, Rhode Island, listed on the NRHP in Newport County, Rhode Island
Raymond-Ogden Mansion, Seattle, Washington, listed on the National Register of Historic Places in King County, Washington
H. C. Ogden House, Wheeling, West Virginia, listed on the NRHP in Ohio County, West Virginia